Shor and Shorshor is a 1926 Soviet comedy film directed by Hamo Beknazarian. Other title: "Armenian Pat & Patachon". Based on a story by M. Bagratuni.

Plot
The film tells of the adventures of rural slackers Shor and Shorshor. Their wives kick them out of the house (without collusion) and tell them that they will be able to return home only when they get hold of food, but the friends use the superstitious villagers only for procuring alcohol.

Cast 
 Hambartsum Khachanyan as Shor
 A. Amirbekyan as Shorshor
 Nina Manucharyan as Yeghso
 Avet Avetisyan as Vardan
 Grigor Avetyan as Miller
 B. Muradyan as Ghukas
 Ye. Adamyan as Heriknaz
 O. Stepanyan as Kyokhva (village headman)
 Arkady Harutyunyan as Ohan (as A. Harutyunyan)
 T. Shamirkhanyan as Vahan
 David Malyan as Devil

Production
The screenplay was written by Hamo Beknazarian in only one night, on the eleventh day of work the film was shot and edited. The director and the actors improvised on set. "Shor and Shorshor" was a huge success both in Armenia and abroad, bringing the studio "more than three hundred thousand ticket sales."

External links

Films directed by Hamo Beknazarian
Soviet black-and-white films
Films set in Armenia
Soviet silent feature films
Soviet comedy films
Soviet-era Armenian films
Armenfilm films
1926 comedy films
1926 films
Armenian comedy films
Silent comedy films